The trifluoromethyl group is a functional group that has the formula -CF3. The naming of is group is derived from the methyl group (which has the formula -CH3), by replacing each hydrogen atom by a fluorine atom. Some common examples are trifluoromethane H–, 1,1,1-trifluoroethane –, and hexafluoroacetone –CO–. Compounds with this group are a subclass of the organofluorines.

Properties
The trifluoromethyl group has a significant electronegativity that is often described as being intermediate between the electronegativities of fluorine and chlorine. For this reason, trifluoromethyl-substituted compounds are often strong acids, such as trifluoromethanesulfonic acid and trifluoroacetic acid. Conversely, the trifluoromethyl group lowers the basicity of compounds like trifluoroethanol.

Uses
The trifluoromethyl group occurs in certain pharmaceuticals, drugs, and abiotically synthesized natural fluorocarbon based compounds. The medicinal use of the trifloromethyl group dates from 1928, although research became more intense in the mid-1940s. The trifluoromethyl group is often used as a bioisostere to create derivatives by replacing a chloride or a methyl group. This can be used to adjust the steric and electronic properties of a lead compound, or to protect a reactive methyl group from metabolic oxidation. Some notable drugs containing trifluoromethyl groups include efavirenz (Sustiva), an HIV reverse transcriptase inhibitor; fluoxetine (Prozac), an antidepressant; and celecoxib (Celebrex), a nonsteroidal anti-inflammatory drug. Sulfoxaflor is used as a systemic insecticide.

The trifluoromethyl group can also be added to change the solubility of molecules containing other groups of interest.

Synthesis

Various methods exist to introduce this functionality. Carboxylic acids can be converted to trifluoromethyl groups by treatment with sulfur tetrafluoride and trihalomethyl compounds, particularly trifluoromethyl ethers and trifluoromethyl aromatics, are converted into trifluoromethyl compounds by treatment with antimony trifluoride/antimony pentachloride (the Swarts reaction). Another route to trifluoromethyl aromatics is the reaction of aryl iodides with trifluoromethyl copper. Finally, trifluoromethyl carbonyls can be prepared by reaction of aldehydes and esters with Ruppert's reagent.

See also 
 Trifluromethyl cation
 Trichloromethyl group
 Trifluoromethoxy group
 Fluoroethyl

References

Haloalkyl groups
 
Functional groups